Chen Dong (born 3 May 1978, in Jilin) is a Chinese football player. He last sided with Dalian Transcendence as goalkeeping coach.

Club career
Chen Dong started his professional career in 1998 playing for the Dalian Wanda where for several seasons with the club he played understudy to Han Wenhai until Han left before the beginning of the 2001 league season. Finally established as the team's first choice goalkeeper he would continue Dalian's dominance within China and win the 2001 league title. His reign was short lived and the emergence of An Qi saw Chen drop back down as to second choice the following season, unable to re-establish himself as the regular first choice goalkeeper. Despite winning several further league titles Chen received very little playing time and in the 2003 league season he would go on loan to Sichuan Guancheng and then Dalian Changbo in the 2004 season where he would gain much more playing time and establish himself as the first choice goalkeeper at both of these clubs. In the 2005 season he would return to Dalian, which had changed its name to Dalian Shide to become their first choice goalkeeper once more and go on to win another league title with them. He remained a consistent performer for Dalian until the 2008 league season when he was criticised for his poor performances with several other players and was dropped for Sun Shoubo, the club kept on to him until the end of the 2009 league season when his contract expired and he was released.

International career
Chen Dong would make his senior international debut in a friendly on February 16, 2003 against Estonia in a 1-0 victory. In total he made three appearances for China, the last was against Thailand in a friendly on the 15 March 2008 coming on as a substitute for Zong Lei, which ended 3-3.

Honours
Dalian Wanda
 Chinese Jia-A League/Chinese Super League: 1998, 2000, 2001, 2002, 2005
 Chinese FA Cup: 2001, 2005

References

External links

1978 births
Living people
Footballers from Changchun
Association football goalkeepers
Chinese footballers
China international footballers
Dalian Shide F.C. players
Sichuan Guancheng players
Chinese Super League players
China League One players
Asian Games medalists in football
Footballers at the 1998 Asian Games
Asian Games bronze medalists for China
Medalists at the 1998 Asian Games